Ian Marshall or Iain Marshall may refer to:

Ian Marshall (English footballer) (born 1966)
Ian Marshall (football manager) (1942–2003), New Zealand Football coach
Ian Marshall (politician), Northern Ireland farmer and politician
Iain Marshall, New Zealand footballer
Iain Marshall, supposed inventor of the Manhattan (cocktail)